Reid Spur is a spur, 5 nautical miles (9 km) long, in the Queen Maud Mountains, descending north along the east side of Ramsey Glacier from an unnamed prominence 3 nautical miles (6 km) northwest of Mount Bellows. Named by Advisory Committee on Antarctic Names (US-ACAN) for CWO James S. Reid, member of the U.S. Army Aviation Detachment which participated in exploring this area with the Texas Tech Shackleton Glacier Expedition, 1964–65.
 

Ridges of the Ross Dependency
Dufek Coast